The Charles Perez Show is a syndicated daytime talk show hosted by former news anchor Charles Perez distributed by Tribune Entertainment, which ran from December 19, 1994 to January 26, 1996. Seeing low ratings, most likely due to the glut of syndicated talk shows which debuted during Perez's second season, Tribune chose to cancel the program in mid-season, ending with a 1.7 average.

The show became a source of controversy in March 1995, when a segment aired which producers reportedly knowingly used an imposter to portray another guest's sister to fabricate a personal story for the benefit of the show. The woman whose name was used and her husband sued the show, which settled the lawsuit.

References

External links
 IMDB

1994 American television series debuts
1996 American television series endings
1990s American television talk shows
First-run syndicated television programs in the United States
Television series by Tribune Entertainment